Route 352 is a 55 km east–west provincial road in the Mauricie region in Quebec, Canada. It goes north from Saint-Maurice (exit 210 of autoroute 40) to Sainte-Thècle.

It goes through the villages of St-Maurice, Saint-Narcisse, Saint-Stanislas, Saint-Adelphe, and then Sainte-Thècle.

From the Saint-Narcisse-Saint-Stanislas border, it follows the Batiscan River to past Saint-Adelphe.

Municipalities along Route 352
 Trois-Rivières
 Saint-Maurice
 Saint-Luc-de-Vincennes
 Saint-Narcisse
 Saint-Stanislas
 Saint-Adelphe
 Sainte-Thècle

Major intersections

See also
 List of Quebec provincial highways

References

External links 
 Provincial Route Map (Courtesy of the Quebec Ministry of Transportation) 
 Route 352 on Google Maps

352
Transport in Trois-Rivières